Marduk-šāpik-zēri, inscribed in cuneiform dAMAR.UTU-DUB-NUMUN or phonetically -ša-pi-ik-ze-ri, and meaning “Marduk (is) the outpourer of seed”, reigned  1077–1065 BC, was the 7th king of the 2nd dynasty of Isin and 4th dynasty of Babylon and he ruled for thirteen years. His relationship with his predecessor, Marduk-nādin-aḫḫē is uncertain. His reign overlapped that of the Assyrian king Aššur-bēl-kala and his immediate predecessor(s) as the Synchronistic King List places him alongside both Tukultī-apil-Ešarra and Aššur-bēl-kala.

Biography

He succeeded Marduk-nadin-aḫḫē, who may possibly have been his father or brother, during a time when the Arameans, driven by famine, were engaged in attacking the Assyrias under Tukultī-apil-Ešarra during his latter years, which Younger places in Tukultī-apil-Ešarra’s 32nd year, or 1081/80 BC. The events are recorded on a fragmentary chronicle. In a letter from the Babylonian astrologer Bel-ušezib to Esarhaddon, 681 – 669 BC, he wrote, “Bel has said: May Esarhaddon, king of Assyria, be seated on his throne like Marduk-šāpik-zēri! – I will deliver all the countries into his hands!” and this may suggest that he was a younger son of Nabû-kudurri-uṣur or there was perhaps a struggle over the succession.

He repaired the E-zida at Borsippa as witnessed by a building inscription, reproduced on a neo-Babylonian tablet, from the reign of Kandalanu whose colophon records that it was copied by Nabû-šumu-līšir. He provided gold votive offerings to the temples of Ur, Nippur and elsewhere. He rebuilt the wall of Babylon, the Imgur-Enlil, for which a fragmentary inscription has come to light, confirmed by the Eclectic Chronicle which continues,

The Synchronistic Chronicle confirms the alliance with Assyria, probably forged to counter the growing threat from the Arameans, and notes that he died during Aššur-bêl-kala’s reign. This records his name as Marduk-shapik-zer-mati and it has been argued by Poebel that this is merely a scribal error, where MAN, šar, “king,” was taken to be part of his name.  There seems to have been a military intervention in the region of Dūr-Kurgalzu by Aššur-bel-kala towards the end of his reign, as the Assyrian king’s Broken Obelisk inscription records that he captured Kadašman-Buriaš, “governor of their land.”

A kudurru records the recovery of certain landed property by Sîn-Kabti-ilāni, the son of Šamaš-šum-lišir and grandson of Kudurri, the šāqû (lúBI.LUL), “cupbearer”. He granted land in his first year to his trusty šakin bāb ekalli, or palace gate officer, Širikti-Šuqamuna, the successor in this role to Uzib-Šiparru, and the land surveyor Nabû-zēra-iddina, “son of Arad-Ea”, was dispatched with a court official to measure it. A kudurru of his reign records another member of the Arad-Ea clan measuring a field with a local official. If the reference to Marduk-[…] can be identified with him in the Chronicle of the Market Prices, the cost of goods was unexceptional. Another fragment of a kudurru  has a secondary inscription dated to his twelfth year. An inscription of Napsamenni, chief of the seers and high priest of Enlil in Nippur, adorns a duck weight, and there is an economic text dated to his third year. This is an administrative record of an inspection by a storeman dated to the 30th day of the month of Ayaru (around March) marked with the seal of the king's officer, Adad-kudurra-uṣur.

Inscriptions

Notes

References

 

11th-century BC Babylonian kings
11th-century BC rulers
Year of birth unknown
Year of death unknown
Kings of the Universe